Adamou is both a given name and a surname. Notable people with the name include:

Surname:
 Adamos Adamou (born 1950), Cypriot politician and Member of the European Parliament for the Progressive Party of Working People
 Chaibou Adamou, player from Cameroon who currently plays in the Thai Division 2 League for Pattani FC
 Dimitrios Adamou (1914–1991), Greek politician and a writer, Member of the European Parliament representing Greece for the Communist Party
 Ivi Adamou (born 1993), Cypriot singer
 Korina Adamou (born 2002), Cypriot footballer
 Nabil Adamou (born 1975), retired Algerian long jumper
 Nafissatou Moussa Adamou (born 1997), Nigerien swimmer

Given name:
 Adamou Allassane, Nigerien Olympic middle-distance runner
 Adamou Harouna, Nigerian military figure, led the military coup which overthrew President Mamadou Tandja in 2010
 Adamou Idé (born 1951), Nigerien poet and novelist
 Adamou Mayaki (born 1919), Nigerian politician and diplomat
 Adamou Moussa (born 1995), Nigerien international footballer
 Adamou Ndam Njoya (born 1942), Cameroonian lawyer, author, professor, politician, and former presidential candidate
 Frederic Adamou Ngove (born 1988), professional Cameroonian footballer currently playing for ES Hammam-Sousse
 Moumouni Adamou Djermakoye (born 1939), Nigerian politician and the President of the Nigerian Alliance for Democracy and Progress

References 

Surnames of Nigerien origin